Grayia may refer to:

Grayia (snake), a genus of African water snakes
Grayia (plant), a genus of desert shrubs in the family Amaranthaceae